This is a list of episodes from the first season of Tour of Duty with episode summaries.

Production

Cast
 Terence Knox as SSG Clayton Ezekiel "Zeke" Anderson
 Stephen Caffrey as 2LT Myron Goldman
 Joshua D. Maurer as Roger Horn
 Steve Akahoshi as Randy "Doc" Matsuda
 Tony Becker as Daniel "Danny" Purcell
 Eric Bruskotter as Scott Baker
 Stan Foster as Marvin Johnson
 Ramón Franco as Alberto Ruiz
 Miguel A. Núñez Jr. as Marcus Taylor
 Kevin Conroy as CPT Rusty Wallace

Crew
Producers:
 Zev Braun - Executive Producer
 Bill L. Norton - Co-Executive Producer
 Ronald L. Schwary - Producer
 Rick Husky - Supervising Producer
 Steve Bello - Co-Producer
 Steven Phillip Smith - Co-Producer

Writers:
 Steve Duncan (2 episodes)
 L. Travis Clark (2 episodes)
 Bill L. Norton (3 episodes)
 Steven Phillip Smith (4 episodes)
 Rick Husky (3 episodes)
 Steve Bello (2 episodes)
 Brad Radnitz (1 episode)
 J. David Wyles (2 episodes)
 Robert Burns Clark (3 episodes)
 David Hume Kennerly (1 episode)
 Dennis Foley (1 episode)
 Jim Beaver (1 episode)
 Bruce Reisman (2 episodes)
 Christian Darren (1 episode)
 Peter Lubliner (1 episode)
 Ronald L. Schwary (1 episode)

Directors:
 Bill L. Norton (7 episodes)
 Aaron Lipstadt (2 episodes)
 Jim Johnson (2 episodes)
 Reynaldo Villalobos (2 episodes)
 Randy Roberts (2 episodes)
 Stephen L. Posey (2 episodes)
 Ronald L. Schwary (1 episode)
 Charles Correll (1 episode)
 Bill Duke (1 episode)
 James L. Conway (1 episode)
 Robert Iscove (1 episode)

Episodes

References

Sources
 Tour of Duty Season 1 - TV.com

External links
 Tour of Duty fanpage

1987 American television seasons
1988 American television seasons
Tour of Duty (TV series) seasons